Ankang University is a   four-year undergraduate  university in Ankang city in Shaanxi Province of the People's Republic of China. It was founded in 1958, but suspended from  1963 to 1978.

References

Ankang
Universities and colleges in Shaanxi
1958 establishments in China
Educational institutions established in 1958